is a junction railway station in the city of Toyokawa, Aichi, Japan, operated by Meitetsu.

Lines

Station layout
The station has three island platforms connected to the station building by a footbridge. The station has automated ticket machines, Manaca automated turnstiles and is staffed.

Platforms

Adjacent stations

Station history 
On 1 April 1935, the Aichi Electric Railway merged with the Nagoya Railroad (the forerunner of present-day Meitetsu). A spur line to Toyokawa was opened on 18 February 1945. In December 1987, the station platforms were extended to be able to accommodate trains of six-carriages in length. The station building was rebuilt in 2008-2009.

Passenger statistics
In fiscal 2017, the station was used by an average of 5113 passengers daily.

Surrounding area
 ruins of Mikawa Kokubun-ji
 Kō Elementary School
 Kō Junior High School

Gallery

See also
 List of Railway Stations in Japan

References

External links

 Official web page 

Railway stations in Japan opened in 1926
Railway stations in Aichi Prefecture
Stations of Nagoya Railroad
Toyokawa, Aichi